Shannan Longzi (Lhünzê) Airport is a dual-use military and civilian airport in Shannan, Tibet and is located at an elevation of . Shannan Airport handled its first flight on 2023 January 12th.

Shannan Airport was first proposed in conjunction with the development of Ali Pulan Airport and Rikaze Dingri Airport, with the site being approved in 2019. The project was approved by the National Development and Reform Commission and construction was started in April 2021.

Airlines and destinations

See also
List of airports in China
List of the busiest airports in China
List of highest airports

References

Airports in China
Shannan, Tibet